Vyacheslav Leonidovych Konstantinovsky (born November 11, 1960) is a Ukrainian businessman and politician who formerly served as a People's Deputy of Ukraine.

Biography
Vyacheslav Leonidovych Konstantinovsky was born in Kyiv. In childhood he was engaged in classical wrestling and held the rank of Master of Sports. He has a twin brother, Alexander. He entered the catering business in the mid-1980s. He lived in the US for seven years and then return in Ukraine in 1997. Later he took part in the Orange Revolution and Euromaidan. 

Criminal Leonid "Lenya Long" Roitman was convicted in the USA in 2006 for ordering the murder of Vyacheslav Konstantinovsky. He was released in 2014.

He and his brother own the Kyiv-Donbas holding, the Kyiv Donbas Development Group, and Carte Blanche restaurant networks. In 2013, their fortune was estimated at $355 million.

In 2014, after the start of the Ukrainian revolution, Konstantinovsky joined the territorial defense battalion Kyiv-1. In summer 2014, he announced that he was selling his Rolls-Royce Phantom to donate the money to the Ukrainian army. On August 8, Konstantinovsky announced that he had received $180000 for the car, which he donated to the Army’s cause against the separatist movement in eastern Ukraine.

Political career 
In September 2014, he announced to run for the Verkhovna Rada. In early parliamentary elections on October 26, he won a single-mandate constituency number 220 in Kyiv, gaining almost 33% of the vote.

On June 17, 2015, Konstantinovsky left the People's Front parliamentary faction.

On July 13, 2017, Vyacheslav Konstantinovsky wrote a statement to renounce his deputy mandate. On his Facebook page, he posted that three years in parliament were the darkest of his life. Konstantinovsky plans to continue doing business.

Income 
According to an electronic declaration for 2015, Konstantinovsky was the wealthiest member of the Verkhovna Rada. He declared $14.7 million, €500,000, and ₴6,778,776 in cash.

The deputy had two land plots in the Kyiv region (with 1500 m² and 647 m²), a house with an area of 649 m², an apartment of 84.4 m² and four garages. 

Konstantinovsky owned Land Rover Sport (2012), a 2002 Harley-Davidson V-Rod muscle, a Toyota Highlander (2016). He also indicated six Rolex watches and a gun among the valuable property.

Philanthropy 
 He and his brother were producers of "Orange love" (2005), the first Ukrainian movie about Orange Revolution. 

 On the end of February 2014, brothers transformed their restaurant Kureni into base of volunteer rapid response unit (70 persons) to maintain peace and order in Kyiv. Later this squad acted near Slovyansk under the command of SBU.

 He donated $50000 to Nataliya Yusupova, who helped Kyiv military hospital after selling Rolls-Royce in 2014. Other money millionaire spent on military equipment for Kyiv-1, one of Territorial defense battalions (Ukraine).

Interesting facts 
 He and Olexandr Konstantinovsky have nickname The Brothers Karamazov after their classical wrestling coach (1972).

 They were born on Syrets in Kyiv.

 They began their business by making ice cream in Russia in the mid-1980, then purchasing cars in USA and selling it in USSR and Ukraine.

 Later they emigrated in Israel, then in USA.

 Vyacheslav Konstantinovsky made a fortune in KDD Company (developing industry). But business has ceased to be profitable after Financial crisis of 2007–2008. And brothers sold KDD in 2011. They are restaurateurs now.

 His favorite musicians are Richie Hawtin, Solomun, Bedouine.

References

1960 births
21st-century Ukrainian politicians
Politicians from Kyiv
Living people
People's Front (Ukraine) politicians
Ukrainian billionaires
National University of Ukraine on Physical Education and Sport alumni
Businesspeople from Kyiv